California's 8th State Senate district is one of 40 California State Senate districts. It is currently represented by Angelique Ashby of Sacramento.

District profile 
The district stretches from the Sacramento suburbs to Death Valley. It encompasses most of the southern Sierra Nevada and parts of the Gold Country and Central Valley. The Central Valley portions comprise most of the district's population.

All of Amador County
 Amador City
 Ione
 Jackson
 Plymouth
 Sutter Creek

All of Calaveras County
 Angels Camp

Fresno County – 55.9%
 Clovis
 Fresno – 69.7%

All of Inyo County
 Bishop

Madera County – 18.9%
 Oakhurst
 Yosemite Lakes

All of Mariposa County
 Mariposa

All of Mono County
 Mammoth Lakes

Sacramento County – 3.0%
 Rancho Cordova – 30.5%

Stanislaus County – 28.2%
 Hughson
 Oakdale
 Turlock
 Waterford

Tulare County – 0.9%
 Three Rivers

All of Tuolumne County
 Sonora

Election results from statewide races

List of senators
Due to redistricting, the 8th district has been moved around different parts of the state. The current iteration resulted from the 2011 redistricting by the California Citizens Redistricting Commission.

Election results 1994 - present

2018

2014

2010

2006

2002

1998

1994

See also
California State Senate Districts
California State Senate
Districts in California

References

External links 

 District map from the California Citizens Redistricting Commission

08
Sierra Nevada (United States)
Government of Amador County, California
Government of Calaveras County, California
Government of Fresno County, California
Government of Inyo County, California
Government of Madera County, California
Government of Mariposa County, California
Government of Mono County, California
Government of Sacramento County, California
Government of Stanislaus County, California
Government of Tulare County, California
Government of Tuolumne County, California
Bishop, California
Clovis, California
Fresno, California
Oakdale, California
Rancho Cordova, California
Sonora, California
Turlock, California